Air Marshal Dilip Kumar Patnaik, AVSM, VM is a retired officer in the Indian Air Force. He served as the Air Officer Commanding-in-Chief (AOC-in-C), Eastern Air Command. He took over the office on 3 October 2021, succeeding of Air Marshal Amit Dev and superannuated on 30 September, 2022. He was succeeded by Air Marshal Sujeet Pushpakar Dharkar.

Early life and education
He is an alumnus of National Defence Academy Khadagwasla and Defence Services Staff College, Tamil Nadu and has done the Higher Air Command Course.

Career
Dilip Kumar Patnaik was commissioned as a fighter pilot in the Indian Air Force on June 08, 1984. He has flying experience of 2500 hours various aircraft including Mig-21 and Mirage 2000.

Patnaik has served as a mission commander for Remotely Piloted Aircraft Unit and has 800 hours experience as on Searcher MK-II & Heron unmanned aircraft.

He has held various appointments including commander of an Air Defence Station, Commandant of Electronic Warfare Range and as a commander of a front-line fighter base. He had served as the Principal Director (Information & Electronic Warfare) at Air HQ, Assistant Chief of Air Staff Operations (Air Defence), Commandant of the prestigious College of  Air Warfare, Telangana.

Previous to his present assignment, he had served as Senior Air Staff Officer for the Central Air Command from 1 August 2020 to 2 October 2021.

Patnaik has conducted many live bombing missions during Kargil conflict.

Honours and decorations 
During his career, Dilip Kumar Patnaik has been awarded the Vayu Sena Medal (Gallantry) for his contribution in Kargil War and Ati Vishisht Seva Medal in 2020.

Personal life 
Dilip Kumar Patnaik is married to Mrs Anuradha Patnaik who is President of Air Force Wives Welfare Association (Regional). The couple is blessed with a son named Bramhtej Patnaik.

References 

Indian Air Force air marshals
Recipients of the Ati Vishisht Seva Medal
Recipients of the Vayu Sena Medal
Living people
Year of birth missing (living people)
Commandants of College of Air Warfare
Defence Services Staff College alumni
College of Air Warfare alumni